The Fanzine Prize is awarded to comics fanzines at the Angoulême International Comics Festival.

1980s
 1981: Basket Bitume from Tours
 1981 (joint winner): Plein la gueule pour pas un rond from Montrouge
 1982: Instant pathétique from Angoulême
 1982 (joint winner): Plein la gueule pour pas un rond from Montrouge
 1983: Dommage from Confolens
 1984: Lard Frit 
 1985: Pizza from Nantes
 1986: Sapristi from Dieppe-Tours
 1987: Champagne 
 1988: Sortez la chienne 
 1989: Café noir

1990s
 1990: Le lézard 
 1991: Reciproquement 
 1992: Hop 
 1993: Jade 
 1994: Le goinfre 
 1995: Rêve-en-bulles 
 1996: La Monstrueuse by Stéphane Blanquet
 1997: Tao , Caen
 1998: Drozophile , Switzerland
 1999: Panel

2000s
 2000: Faille temporelle 
 2001: Stripburger , Slovenia
 Special mention: Le collectionneur de Bandes-dessinées
 2002: Le phaco de Nice 
 2003: Rhinocéros contre éléphant 
 2004: Sturgeon White Moss by Sylvia Farago
 (2005: no award in this category)
 (2006: no award in this category)

2020s
 2020: Komikaze #18 (from Croatia)
2021: KUTIKUTI, The Thick book of KUTI (from Finland)

References

Fanzine Prize
Fanzines